The Swordswoman may refer to:

 "Xianü" (short story), a short story by Pu Songling published in Strange Tales from a Chinese Studio
 The Swordswoman of Huangjiang, a 20th-century wuxia series
 The Swordswoman, a 1982 fantasy novel by Jessica Amanda Salmonson